Twin Peaks, Washington is a fictional town in the U.S. state of Washington, serving as the primary setting of the television series Twin Peaks, created by Mark Frost and David Lynch, and the 2017 revival Twin Peaks: The Return. It was also featured in scenes in the 1992 movie Twin Peaks: Fire Walk with Me and the feature-length deleted scenes compilation, Twin Peaks: The Missing Pieces. Places commonly shown within the series include the Double R Diner, The Great Northern Hotel and, the Black and White Lodges.

FBI Special Agent Dale Cooper states, in the pilot episode, that the town of Twin Peaks is "five miles south of the Canadian border, and twelve miles west of the state line". This places it in the Salmo-Priest Wilderness. Lynch and Frost started their location search in Snoqualmie, Washington, on the recommendation of a friend of Frost. They found all of the locations that they had written into the pilot episode. The towns of Snoqualmie, North Bend and Fall City – which became the primary filming locations for stock Twin Peaks exterior footage – are about an hour's drive from the town of Roslyn, Washington, the town used for the series Northern Exposure. Many exterior scenes were filmed in wooded areas of Malibu, California. Most of the interior scenes were shot on standing sets in a San Fernando Valley warehouse.

Double R Diner

The frequently seen Double R Diner is owned and managed by the character Norma Jennings, portrayed by actress Peggy Lipton.  Twin Peaks character Shelly Johnson, portrayed by actress Mädchen Amick, works there as a waitress, alongside Heidi portrayed by Andrea Hays.

When filming began on the original Twin Peaks series in 1989, the Mar-T Cafe located in North Bend, Washington was used as the Double R Diner location in the series pilot and the prequel film Fire Walk With Me and served as the model for the Hollywood sound stage set where all other Double R Diner interior scenes were filmed. The restaurant was sold in 1998 to Kyle Twede, who renamed it Twede's Cafe.

A fire gutted Twede's Cafe in July 2000 and was the result of arson. News of the incident described the perpetrators as burglars who had set the cafe ablaze to cover up their theft of $450. In an interview from May 2015, Kyle Twede described the arsonists as kids who had broken into the cafe to mess around and drink wine coolers and, fearing they would get in trouble, chose to set the place on fire.  The interior was destroyed, while the exterior neon sign and the structure remained; Twede’s Cafe reopened in 2001 with a new interior that looked nothing like the Double R Diner.

As of September 2015, as part of the production of the 2017 season of Twin Peaks, the series production company restored the interior of Twede’s Cafe to the original Double R Diner interior.  The renovations were reportedly permanent and remained in place after filming wrapped.

The Great Northern Hotel

Much of the series takes place in The Great Northern Hotel. The lead character, FBI Agent Dale Cooper, is a resident of the hotel for the length of the original series.
The exterior of The Great Northern Hotel is the Salish Lodge in Snoqualmie, WA. (In 1988, the building was completely remodeled and reopened as the Salish Lodge.) The lodge that inspired The Great Northern Hotel is the Kiana Lodge in Poulsbo, Washington. The Kiana Lodge was built in the late 1920s and is furnished with alder bentwood pieces dating from that era.

The hotel is owned by Ben Horne, a business associate of Leland Palmer; the death of whose daughter Laura Palmer is the catalyst for the series.

Black and White Lodges

The Black Lodge is an extradimensional place which seems to include, primarily, the "Red Room" first seen by Agent Cooper in a dream early in the series. As events in the series unfold, it becomes apparent that the characters from the Red Room, the room itself and the Black Lodge, along with the White Lodge, are connected.

At first it is revealed that there is a mysterious dark presence in the woods that the town's Bookhouse Boys have been combatting for generations. Although they do not know what it is, Native American policeman Deputy Hawk says that the Black Lodge is from the mythology of his people, describing it as:
The shadow-self of the White Lodge. The legend says that every spirit must pass through there on the way to perfection. There, you will meet your own shadow self. My people call it 'The Dweller on the Threshold' ... But it is said, if you confront the Black Lodge with imperfect courage, it will utterly annihilate your soul.

During the second season, Windom Earle relates a story about the White Lodge:
Once upon a time, there was a place of great goodness, called the White Lodge. Gentle fawns gamboled there amidst happy, laughing spirits. The sounds of innocence and joy filled the air. And when it rained, it rained sweet nectar that infused one's heart with a desire to live life in truth and beauty. Generally speaking, a ghastly place, reeking of virtue's sour smell. Engorged with the whispered prayers of kneeling mothers, mewling newborns, and fools, young and old, compelled to do good without reason ... But, I am happy to point out that our story does not end in this wretched place of saccharine excess. For there's another place, its opposite: A place of almost unimaginable power, chock full of dark forces and vicious secrets. No prayers dare enter this frightful maw. The spirits there care not for good deeds or priestly invocations, they're as likely to rip the flesh from your bone as greet you with a happy "good day". And if harnessed, these spirits in this hidden land of unmuffled screams and broken hearts would offer up a power so vast that its bearer might reorder the Earth itself to his liking.

As the Black and White Lodges become more prominent in the story, Major Briggs claims that during one or more of his disappearances, he had visited the White Lodge and goes on to offer advice regarding it. There is no clear evidence of him being affected by the Black Lodge and it is not clear how he arrives there - aside from a bright flash of light - or what the purpose of his trips were.

Location
Although the Red Room began exclusively as a location within Agent Dale Cooper's dreams, the inhabitants began appearing in other locations in the town, inciting other elements in the plot, to the point where the Red Room and White/Black Lodge stories became one. After discovering a mysterious map in Owl Cave, it becomes evident to Earle and Cooper—both independently and with different motivations for wanting to visit it—that the entrance to the Black Lodge is located in Ghostwood Forest which surrounds the town of Twin Peaks, at a pool of a substance that smells like scorched engine oil and surrounded by 12 young sycamore trees. This area is known as Glastonbury Grove.

It is said that the key to gain entrance to the Black Lodge is fear—usually an act of brutal murder. This is in contrast to the key to the White Lodge, which is love. Another requirement to enter the Black Lodge through the entrance in Glastonbury Grove is that it may only be entered "...when Jupiter and Saturn meet..." When the above requirements are met and one approaches the pool in Glastonbury Grove, red curtains appear, which the person walks between before the curtains vanish once again.

Interior
There is little furniture in the Red Room aside from a few armchairs, a wheeled table and a couple of floor lamps. There is also a statue of the Venus de Medici, easily mistaken for the Venus de Milo (the Venus de Milo can be seen in the hallway). There are no doors to speak of; movement from room to room is accomplished by crossing through another set of red curtains that lead to a narrow hallway. The floor is a chevron pattern of brown and white, and all sides of any room and all walls of any hallway encountered are covered by identical red curtains. In the final episode, a second room in the Lodge is seen, identical to the first. Between the two rooms is a narrow corridor which has the same floor and "walls" as the other two rooms.

Although the Lodge inhabitants speak English, their voices are warped and strangely clipped and their movements are unnatural (this effect is accomplished by the actors performing in reverse and the footage is then played backwards). Residents often speak in riddles and non-sequiturs. The main inhabitants of the Lodge are The Man from Another Place, The Giant and Killer Bob.

In the final episode of Twin Peaks, Cooper meets The Man from Another Place, who refers to the Red Room as the "waiting room". This coincides with Hawk's claim that every spirit must pass through the Black Lodge on the way to perfection and that the Red Room leads to the White Lodge as well.

The red curtains, zig-zag floors and bright spotlights of the White and Black Lodges have also appeared in several of David Lynch's other films, suggesting that Lynch may view their influences as ongoing in his narrative worlds. As the Masonic historian archeologist David Harrison notes in his article on Twin Peaks, the floor resembles a zig-zag version of the Mosaic Pavement in a Masonic lodge, hence the names Black Lodge and White Lodge, which consists of squares in the middle, but of triangles at the borders. As the focus of the series is on how to pass through from one surreal realm into the other, or how to transcend from one level of fear of this metaphysical realm to the one associated with love and that both are a way to come to a cumulative, final interpretation on the matter of reality itself, reachable from both sides of the medal, the condensation and reduction of the symbolism to a zig-zag floor makes sense in context of the series' themes.

Inhabitants
The Black Lodge and White Lodges are home to many spirits and people alike including Bob, Mike, The Man From Another Place, The Giant, Laura Palmer (passing through the Red Room before ascending to the White Lodge), and Dale Cooper.

The spirits can possess humans if they are let in: Bob possesses Leland Palmer, but not Laura, who refuses to let him in. Later, Bob possesses Dale Cooper's doppelganger (not Cooper himself); The Giant and an elderly waiter from the Great Northern Hotel were "one and the same". Mike and The Man From Another Place (Mike's arm) possess Phillip Gerard.

References in popular culture
In the two-part Simpsons episode, "Who Shot Mr. Burns?", Chief Clancy Wiggum has trouble solving the case and falls into a dream sequence in which he sits in the Red Room with Lisa Simpson, who speaks backwards. She gives him clues in reverse-speak, but Wiggum is unable to understand her until she gives up in frustration and speaks normally. As with Twin Peaks, while recording Lisa's lines for the segment, Yeardley Smith recorded the part backwards and it was reversed. Several other parts in the segment are direct references to Twin Peaks, including a moving shadow on the curtain, and Wiggum's hair standing straight up after waking.

In the manga series Soul Eater, the Red Room is used as a motif when Soul Eater and Maka Albarn are infected with Black Blood. A demon who dances backward (similar to The Man from Another Place) to a skipping jazz record attempts to convince them to give in to the Black Blood's madness.

The Red Room is also parodied as "The Sitting Room" in multiple episodes of Scooby-Doo! Mystery Incorporated, first accessed by Scooby-Doo in a dream and later accessed by all of Mystery, Inc. under mass hypnosis. A helper figure similar to The Man from Another Place appears there, and, like the original Man, is played by Michael J. Anderson. The Sitting Room appears to be a spirit realm where both helpful and malicious entities can dwell, as well as pieces of the souls of those tainted by the Treasure of Crystal Cove.

A parody of the Red Room is featured as "The Club" in Gravity Falls, Season 1, Episode 4 "The Hand That Rocks the Mabel".

In an interview, Atlus co-founder Kazuma Kaneko confirmed that the Black Lodge was the main source of inspiration for the Velvet Room's design in the Persona video game series, though the color of the room was altered to blue in reference to David Lynch's film Blue Velvet.

The cult classic video game Deadly Premonition, that was heavily influenced by Twin Peaks, also has a Red Room of sorts that the protagonist Agent York Morgan visits on his dreams.

The video game The Evil Within 2 frequently uses the Red Room motif, in association with one of the primary antagonists, Stefano Valentini.

On an episode of The Late Late Show with James Corden in September 2017, the opening segment featured actor Kyle MacLachlan having turned his dressing room into the Red Room, including speaking in the warped backwards manner.

It is also referenced in All Hail King Julien in the third episode of season three "Dance, Dance, Resolution" in which Mort speaks backwards to King Julien in the black lodge, you can see the mythical pineapple shadow on the red curtains and King Julien's parents there, to which King Julian asks "Mort why are you talking backwards!?", Mort then does a strange forward walk that also seems somewhat backwards to which King Julien's parents clap, King Julien then tries to please his parents which then turns into Maurice, then King Julien awakes.

"Black Lodge" (song)
Twin Peaks''' score conductor Angelo Badalamenti helped write the song "Black Lodge" on the 1993 Sound of White Noise'' album by Anthrax. The song was released as the album's third single on August 19, 1993.

The sound of the song differs greatly from the band's earlier thrash metal tracks, with AllMusic's Dave Connolly describing it as "cooled-down".

Music video
A music video was created for the song, being directed by future filmmaker Mark Pellington.

The video centers on a man and his wife, with the latter appearing to be a paraplegic. The man bathes, feeds, and dresses his wife, puts her in the backseat of a car and drives down Hollywood Boulevard. The man picks up a woman off of the street, Daphne (played by Jenna Elfman), with his assistant drugging her and taking her to an empty building. The assistant dresses Daphne up to look like the wife then straps her into a chair and places electrodes on her, while the wife sits across from her in a similar chair. The man tries to stimulate Daphne by rubbing her legs and having a puppy lick her face while the wife seems to feel what the woman does. The wife quickly returns to a catatonic state, while the assistant carries Daphne off and takes her picture in front of a backdrop that resembles the Red Room. As the video ends, the camera cuts to a shot of a board with several dozen pictures of other women who went through the same ordeal that Daphne did.

The band members briefly appear in the video, showing up in quick shots in the Red Room.

Track listing

Personnel
Anthrax
John Bush – lead vocals
Dan Spitz – lead guitar
Scott Ian – rhythm guitar, backing vocals
Frank Bello – bass
Charlie Benante – drums

Additional
Vincent Bell – tremolo guitar parts
Angelo Badalamenti – synthesizers, orchestration and arrangement of synthesizers and additional guitars

Chart positions

References

External links 
Welcome to Twin Peaks: Double R Diner Walkthrough Video
The Real Great Northern Hotel at InTwinPeaks.com

Fictional dimensions
Twin Peaks
Anthrax (American band) songs
Fictional populated places in Washington (state)